Glenda Phillips (born 12 May 1945) is a British former swimmer. She competed in the women's 100 metre butterfly at the 1964 Summer Olympics.

References

1945 births
Living people
British female swimmers
Olympic swimmers of Great Britain
Swimmers at the 1964 Summer Olympics
Female butterfly swimmers